The Windrow Formation is a geologic formation in Minnesota named after Windrow Bluff on Fort McCoy, Monroe County, Wisconsin. It preserves fossils dating back to the Cretaceous period.

See also

 List of fossiliferous stratigraphic units in Minnesota
 Paleontology in Minnesota

References

 

Cretaceous Minnesota